A.V. Bellarmin (born 5 May 1954) is an Indian politician, belonging to the Communist Party of India (Marxist). He was a member of the 14th Lok Sabha, representing the Nagercoil constituency of Tamil Nadu. According to the CPM, He has held responsibilities in the General Workers’ Union, the Fish Workers’ Union and the Union of Construction Workers in Kanyakumari district and fought for the rights of workers. He is a serving member of the District Secretariat of CPM. During his stint as a member of Lok Sabha, he served as member of the Standing Committees on Defense and on External Affairs.

As a part of the standing committee on external affairs, he had championed the cause of Indian migrant laborers working in foreign countries, especially the middle-east. Calling himself as a social activist, Mr. Bellarmin cites the  setting up of Kendriya Vidyalaya at Konam in Nagercoil and commissioning of Kuzhithurai bridge on NH47 among his achievements during his tenure as a member of the 14th Lok Sabha. Besides, A.V.Bellarmin has been fighting against sand mining in the coasts of Kanyakumari. In an open letter, he said 

A.V. Bellarmin is contesting for the Kanyakumari Lok Sabha Constituency in the 2014 elections. His poll promises include: setting up of a commercial harbour at Colachel, IT park and rubber research centre in Kanyakumari district and restoration of The Anantha Victoria Marthandam Canal (AVM canal)  so that it could be used for transportation of goods between Kanyakumari and Thiruvananthapuram. The AVM canal that runs along the west coast is also expected to boost revenues from tourism, if renovated.

References

External links
 Members of Fourteenth Lok Sabha - Parliament of India website
 CPIM website speaking about A.V. Bellarmin
 Fourteenth report of the standing committee on external affairs
 The Hindu's news article on Bellarmin 
 Bellarmin's open letter 
 A.V. Bellarmin's questions raised on 25 February 2009 in the Lok Sabha

People from Kanyakumari district
Living people
1954 births
India MPs 2004–2009
Communist Party of India (Marxist) politicians from Tamil Nadu
Lok Sabha members from Tamil Nadu
Communist Party of India (Marxist) candidates in the 2014 Indian general election